was a village located in Hidaka District, Wakayama Prefecture, Japan.

As of 2003, the village had an estimated population of 2,499 and a density of 28.72 persons per km². The total area was 87.02 km².

On May 1, 2005, Nakatsu, along with the town of Kawabe, and the village of Miyama (all from Hidaka District), was merged to create the town of Hidakagawa.

External links
Nakatsu official village website 
Hidakagawa official town website 

Dissolved municipalities of Wakayama Prefecture